Mahmoud Abdel-Aati (born 2 December 1992), commonly known as Dunga, is an Egyptian footballer who plays as a midfielder for Ismaily SC.

Honours

Club
Zamalek
Egypt Cup: 2016, 2017–18
Egyptian Super Cup: 2016
 Saudi-Egyptian Super Cup: 2018

References

External links
Player Profile at Soccerway

Living people
1992 births
Egyptian footballers
Egyptian expatriate footballers
Association football midfielders
PFC Svetkavitsa players
Nogoom FC players
Misr Lel Makkasa SC players
Zamalek SC players
Ismaily SC players
First Professional Football League (Bulgaria) players
Egyptian Premier League players
Expatriate footballers in Bulgaria